Kentucky gained 4 seats to 6 in reapportionment after the 1800 census.

See also 
 United States House of Representatives elections, 1802 and 1803
 List of United States representatives from Kentucky

1803
Kentucky
United States House of Representatives